Christopher Arnold "Duke" Iversen (February 26, 1920 – May 20, 2011) was an American football player who played five seasons in the National Football League and All-America Football Conference with the New York Giants, New York Yankees and New York Yanks. He was drafted by the New York Giants in the seventh round of the 1947 NFL Draft. He played college football at the University of Oregon and attended Petaluma High School in Petaluma, California. His family's name was spelled "Iverson" but a doctor misspelled it as "Iversen" on Duke's birth certificate.

References

External links
 Just Sports Stats
 

1920 births
2011 deaths
Players of American football from California
Sportspeople from the San Francisco Bay Area
American football running backs
Oregon Ducks football players
New York Giants players
New York Yankees (AAFC) players
New York Yanks players
People from Petaluma, California